ECMP may refer to:

 Equal-cost multi-path routing
 Electronic Countermeasure Pod
 Extracellular matrix protein
 European Confederation of Modern Pentathlon
 Electric Common Modular Platform (e-CMP), an electric vehicle platform produced by Stellantis